Catarina Cantanhede Melônio Macário (born October 4, 1999) is a Brazilian-born American professional soccer player who plays as a midfielder for Lyon in the French Division 1 Féminine. She represents the United States internationally.

Macario was a decorated collegiate player in the United States. In 2017, she was named "Freshman of the Year" by the TopDrawerSoccer.com and ESPNW Player of the Year. In 2018, Macario won the Hermann Trophy, ESPNW Player of the Year, and the TopDrawerSoccer.com National Player of the Year Award. In 2019, Macario won the Honda Sports Award and again won the Hermann Trophy.

Early life
Macario was born in São Luís, Maranhão, Brazil. She started playing football at the age of 4, following the footsteps of her older brother, Steve. She started playing in the academy of Flamengo in São Luís. She remained there for less than 6 months before switching to the Cruzeiro academy. At the age of 7, she moved with the family to Brasilia, the capital of Brazil. In Brasilia, Catarina played for the Santos academy, where she remained until she moved to the United States in December 2011. In Brazil, Catarina had always played for men's teams and only started playing for a women's team after arriving in the United States. In 2011, at the age of 12 and without speaking any English, Macario relocated with her father and brother to San Diego, California in order to pursue her dream of playing soccer. Her mother, a doctor, remained in Brazil in order to financially support the family. While playing for the San Diego Surf as a youth player, she broke the all-time goalscoring record in the ECNL with 165 goals.

Stanford University
On February 1, 2017, Macario committed to play collegiately for Stanford University. In her freshman year in 2017, she played 25 matches, scoring 17 goals and clinching 16 assists. As a result of her performance this year she won several awards, including being named "ESPNW Player of the Year", "TopDrawerSoccer.com Freshman of the Year", "Pac-12 Forward of the Year", and "Pac-12 Freshman of the Year".

In her sophomore year in 2018, Macario scored 14 goals with 8 assists in 19 matches played. On December 11, 2018, she received the TopDrawerSoccer.com National Player of the Year Award. On January 4, 2019, Macario won the MAC Hermann Trophy, awarded to the nation's top female and male players. Additionally, she was named "espnW Player of the Year" and "Pac-12 Forward of the Year" for the second year in a row.

In her junior year, Macario was the winner of the Honda Sports Award, given to the nation's top female collegiate soccer player. She was also awarded the MAC Hermann Trophy a second time, becoming the sixth woman to repeat as winner since the award was established in 1988.

Stanford won the NCAA Women's College Cup in her freshman and junior years.

Professional
On January 8, 2021, Macario announced that she would be forgoing her senior season at Stanford to start her professional career. On January 12, 2021, Lyon announced they signed Macario for 2.5 years. She made her debut for Lyon in the Division 1 Féminine on February 6, 2021, coming on as a substitute in the 37th minute for Amandine Henry in a 2–1 win against Montpellier.

International career
Macario is eligible to play internationally for Brazil and the United States. She was called to represent the United States at several youth levels. Macario stated that she intended to represent the United States at the senior level, turning down several approaches from the Brazilian Football Confederation. She generally plays as a midfielder for the United States, although Vlatko Andonovski has stated she could move to a false nine role in the future.

On October 8, 2020, Macario received her first call up to represent the United States at senior level, though she could not yet do this in games until she received clearance from FIFA. Later the same day, she announced on Twitter that she had acquired American citizenship. On January 13, 2021, U.S. Soccer announced that Macario received clearance from FIFA to represent the United States internationally. On January 18, 2021, Macario debuted for the United States, coming in the half-time of a friendly match against Colombia, thus becoming the first naturalized citizen ever to play for the US senior women's team. In the next game, another friendly against Colombia, she started for the first time, scoring her first international goal, on January 22, 2021.

On June 23, 2021, Macario was included in the United States roster for the 2020 Summer Olympics.

Personal life
Despite declaring herself a fan of Marta, Macario stated that her favorite soccer player is American former forward Mia Hamm.

Career statistics

College

Club

International

International goals

Honors
Lyon
UEFA Women's Champions: 2021–22
International
 SheBelieves Cup: 2021; 2022
 Olympic Bronze Medal: 2021
Individual
 ESPNW Player of the Year: 2017, 2018
 Hermann Trophy: 2018, 2019
 CoSIDA Academic All-District 8 first team: 2018
 TopDrawerSoccer.com Freshman of the Year: 2017
 TopDrawerSoccer.com Player of the Year: 2018, 2019
 United Soccer Coaches First-Team All-America: 2017, 2018
 Pac-12 Forward of the Year: 2017, 2018
 Pac-12 Freshman of the Year: 2017
Honda Sports Award: 2020
 Best Player SheBelieves Cup: 2022

References

External links
 
 Catarina Macario at Stanford University
 
 Catarina Macario at U.S. Soccer

1999 births
Living people
People from São Luís, Maranhão
Soccer players from San Diego
American women's soccer players
United States women's international soccer players
American sportspeople of Brazilian descent
Brazilian emigrants to the United States
Brazilian women's footballers
Women's association football forwards
American expatriate women's soccer players
American expatriate sportspeople in France
Expatriate women's footballers in France
Hermann Trophy women's winners
Stanford Cardinal women's soccer players
Olympique Lyonnais Féminin players
Division 1 Féminine players
People with acquired American citizenship
Footballers at the 2020 Summer Olympics
Olympic bronze medalists for the United States in soccer
Medalists at the 2020 Summer Olympics
Sportspeople from Maranhão